The Japanese language has a system of honorific speech, referred to as , parts of speech that show respect. Their use is mandatory in many social situations. Honorifics in Japanese may be used to emphasize social distance or disparity in rank, or to emphasize social intimacy or similarity in rank. Japanese honorific titles, often simply called honorifics, consist of suffixes and prefixes when referring to others in a conversation.

The system is very extensive, having its own special vocabulary and grammatical forms to express various levels of respectful, humble, and polite speech. It closely resembles other honorifics systems found in the East Asian cultural sphere, such as honorifics in Korean.

Introduction
Japanese uses honorific constructions to show or emphasize social rank, social intimacy or similarity in rank. The choice of pronoun used, for example, will express the social relationship between the person speaking and the person being referred to, and Japanese often avoids pronouns entirely in favor of more explicit titles or kinship terms.

Honorific speech is often longer, and sometimes much longer, than more direct speech. Some extreme, but not uncommon, examples include the following:

When asking a question: the first is casually between friends, the second is a junior person asking a superior in a formal meeting:
聞いていい？
Kiite ii?
Ok to ask (a question)?
聞かせていただけると嬉しいのですが。
Kikasete-itadakeru to ureshii no desu ga.
I would, however, be delighted if I may be permitted to ask (a question).

When asking for cooperation: the first is usual and polite, the latter is very formal, but often found in writing, especially in posters or flyers.
ご協力下さい。
Go-kyōryoku-kudasai.
Your cooperation, please.
ご協力の程お願い申し上げます。
Go-kyōryoku no hodo o-negai mōshiagemasu.
We respectfully request the favor of a measure of your cooperation.
This latter example includes two honorific prefixes, nominalization of a verb (for formality), a respectful form, and two humble forms.

Types of honorifics

Linguistically the first is an addressee honorific, used for someone being talked to, and the latter two are referent honorifics, used for someone being talked about. These two other categories use the same forms as the general categories, but are used in different contexts, hence differentiated by some linguists. Each type of speech has its own vocabulary and verb endings.

For example, the standard form of the verb "to do" is suru.  This form is appropriate with family members and close friends.  The polite form of suru, the addressee honorific, is shimasu.  This form is appropriate in most daily interactions.  When showing respect, such as when talking about a customer or a superior, however, the respectful word nasaru and its polite form nasaimasu are used, and when referring to one's own actions or the actions of a group member, the humble word itasu and its polite form itashimasu are used.  These respectful and humble words are referent honorifics, and thus can coexist with addressee honorific -masu.

Polite language

 is characterized by the use of the sentence ending "desu" and the verb ending "-masu" and the use of prefixes such as "o-" and "go-" towards neutral objects. Television presenters invariably use polite language, and it is the form of the language first taught to most non-native learners of Japanese.

Polite language can be used to refer to one's own actions or those of other people.

Respectful language

 is a special form or alternative word used when talking about superiors and customers. It is not used to talk about oneself. For example, when a Japanese hairdresser or dentist requests their client to take a seat, they say o kake ni natte kudasai to mean "please sit down". However, they would use the verb suwaru る rather than o kake ni naru to refer to themselves sitting down. The respectful version of language can only be used to refer to others.

In general, respectful language is directed at those in positions of power; for example, a superior at work, or a customer. It also implies that the speaker is acting in a professional capacity.

It is characterized by lengthy polite expressions. Common verbs may be replaced by more polite alternative verbs, for example suru (do) by nasaru, or hanasu (talk) by ossharu when the subject is a person of respect. Some of these transformations are many-to-one: iku (go), kuru (come), and iru (be) all become irassharu, and taberu (eat) and nomu (drink) both become meshiagaru.

Verbs may also be changed to respectful forms. One respectful form is a modification of the verb with a prefix and a polite suffix. For example, yomu (read) becomes o-yomi ni naru, with the prefix o- added to the i-form of the verb, and the verb ending ni naru.  The verb ending -(r)areru can also be used, such as yomareru.

Nouns also undergo substitution to express respect. The normal Japanese word for person  becomes  in respectful language. Thus, a customer would normally be expected to be referred to as a kata rather than a hito.

Humble language

In general, humble language is used when describing one's actions or the actions of a person in one's in-group to others such as customers in business. Humble language tends to imply that one's actions are taking place in order to assist the other person.

 is similar to respectful language, in substituting verbs with other forms. For example: suru (do) becomes itasu, and morau (receive) becomes itadaku. These two verbs are also seen in set phrases such as dō itashimashite (you're welcome) and itadakimasu (いただきます—a phrase said before eating or drinking).

Similar to respectful language, verbs can also change their form by adding a prefix and the verb "suru" or "itasu". For example, motsu (carry) becomes o mochi shimasu. The use of humble forms may imply doing something for the other person; thus a Japanese person might offer to carry something for someone else by saying o mochi shimasu. This type of humble form also appears in the set phrase o matase shimashita, "I am sorry to have kept you waiting", from mataseru (make wait) with the addition of o and shimasu.  Similarly, o negai shimasu, "please [do this]", from negau (request or hope for), again with the addition of o and shimasu.

Even more politely, the form motasete itadaku literally means "humbly be allowed to carry".  This phrase would be used to express the idea that "I will carry it if you please."

The same forms may also be used when the speaker is not the agent, as a courtesy to the listener, as in the common phrase 電車が参ります (densha ga mairimasu "a train is arriving") at rail stations. In the case, the announcer him or herself is not arriving, but he or she is simply being courteous. Some linguists distinguish this from kenjōgo (where the speaker is the agent), calling it instead teichōgo (丁重語) "courteous language", and defining it formally as:
Honorifics by which the Speaker shows consideration to the hearer through all expressions of the subject matter.
This category was first proposed by Hiroshi Miyachi (宮地裕). Teichōgo, as an addressee honorific, is always used with the teineigo (-masu) form, the politeness sequence (using "go" as an example) being 行く, 行きます, 参ります (iku, ikimasu, mairimasu).

In humble language, name suffixes are dropped when referring to people from inside one's group. Thus, Japanese-speaking company executives would introduce themselves and their team by saying "I am Gushiken, the president, and this is Niwa, the CEO."

Similarly to respectful language, nouns can also change. The word , meaning "person", becomes . The humble version is used when referring to oneself or members of one's group, such as one's company.

Respectful verbs

1 The distinction between these three verbs is lost in some respectful forms.

Word beautification

This form of language is employed by the speaker to add refinement to one's manner of speech.

 
 
 Tea and rice crackers go well (together), don't they? 

In finer classifications, the above example is classified as word beautification—rather than honorific speech—as the speaker is voicing a general opinion regarding tea and rice crackers and is not intentionally deferential towards the listener. In the following example, the speaker is directly referring to the listener and items received by them and is regarded as honorific language:

 
 
 The sweets you gave me were most delectable. 

See the section on honorific prefixes, below, for further discussion.

Usage

Business

Honorifics are considered extremely important in a business setting. Training in honorifics usually does not take place at school or university, so company trainees are trained in correct use of honorifics to customers and superiors.

In groups and out groups

When using polite or respectful forms, the point of view of the speaker is shared by the speaker's in-group (内 uchi), so in-group referents do not take honorifics. For example, members of one's own company are referred to with humble forms when speaking with an external person; similarly, family members of the speaker are referred to humbly when speaking to guests. Similarly, the out-group (外 soto) addressee or referent is always mentioned in the polite style (though not necessarily with honorifics).

Mastery of politeness and honorifics is important for functioning in Japanese society. Not speaking politely enough can be insulting, and speaking too politely can be distancing (and therefore also insulting) or seem sarcastic. Children generally speak using plain informal speech, but they are expected to master politeness and honorifics by the end of their teenage years. Recent trends indicate that the importance of proper politeness is not as high as before, particularly in metropolitan areas. The standards are inconsistently applied towards foreigners, though most textbooks attempt to teach the polite style before considering to teach any of the other styles.

Intrafamilial address

Similar to how titles are used instead of personal pronouns when addressing a person of higher status, roles and kinship terms are used in intrafamilial settings where one can refer to other family members by using their role in relation to the speaker instead of a personal pronoun. For example, older relatives cannot be addressed as anata, kimi or simply by their name alone. Instead, a term denoting their relationship with the speaker or their name suffixed by an appropriate kinship term is used, such as otōsan when speaking to one’s father. Those younger than the speaker can generally be addressed by using personal pronouns or their name. Thus, the choice of whether a family member can be addressed by using a personal pronoun, their name or their role is dependent on the position of the speaker within the family.

Gender differences

Depending on the situation, women's speech may contain more honorifics than men's. This is part of a general pattern of speech differences by sex. However, in many settings, such as in customer service, there will be little or no difference between male and female speech.

Grammatical overview

Japanese has grammatical functions to express several different pragmatic registers. Not only politeness but also respectfulness, humility and formality can be expressed.

Expressing politeness

There are three levels of politeness, plain or direct ( futsūtai or 常体 jōtai), polite or distal (敬体 keitai or 丁寧 teinei), and formal (generally, 敬語 keigo or 最敬体 saikeitai). Formal and polite can be combined. For example, for the sentence "This is a book",

The informal style is used among friends, the distal or polite style by inferiors when addressing superiors and among strangers or casual acquaintances, and the formal style generally in writing or prepared speeches. The plain formal and informal styles of verbs are nearly identical, with a few grammatical differences, such as the verb de aru being used as a formal copula, and the preferential usage of verb stems to connect clauses instead of the "te form". Formal language in Japanese also uses different vocabulary and structures from informal language.

In some contexts, where both the imperfective (incomplete: present/future) and perfective (complete: past) tenses are acceptable, the perfective is considered more polite. This is only at the completion of an activity; common examples are ありがとうございました arigatō gozaimashita "thank you (for a completed favor)", ご馳走様でした go-chisō-sama deshita "it was a feast (for a completed meal)", 失礼しました shitsurei shimashita "I have been rude (when leaving, after a visit)". For example, when entering someone's office, one conventionally says 失礼します shitsurei shimasu, as the visit is not complete yet, while when exiting one may say either shitsurei shimasu or, more politely, 失礼しました shitsurei shimashita. Many phrases cannot be used in the perfective in this way, as the referent is as yet incomplete. For example, the standard greeting お早うございます ohayō gozaimasu "Good morning" (lit. "It is early") cannot be said as ×お早うございました *ohayō gozaimashita "It was early", as it is used only during the morning.

Expressing respect

Further to this, there is another factor, respect, which is indicated in yet other ways.
For each politeness level there are two . 
The  form shows respect to the subject of the sentence.
The  form gives respect to the (direct or indirect) object by a variety of means, the most common being to humble the speaker.
These respectful forms are represented by different verb endings. Since verbs come at the end of the sentence in Japanese, most of the factors of formality, politeness, and respect are expressed at the very end of each sentence.

The o-machi-suru humble forms carry an implication that the waiting or other activity is being (humbly) done by the speaker for the benefit of the person being addressed. Thus a humble sentence is unlikely to take a third person subject. For example, a sentence like jon ga sensei o o machi suru (John waits for the teacher) is unlikely to occur.

Honorific titles
Honorific suffixes and prefixes are used when referring to others in a conversation. They reflect not only the level of politeness chosen, but also the relative social rank or the degree of intimacy between people. For example, a person might refer to their classmate or colleague as Asada-san ("Mr./Ms. Asada"), but to their little son as Hideyo-chan ("lil' Hideyo"). Referring to somebody without using a honorific is a sign of great informality or intimacy.

The most common honorifics include:

Requests

Japanese requests and commands have many set forms depending on who is being addressed by whom. For example, the phrase yoroshiku o negai shimasu, meaning "I ask your favor" can take various forms. At the bottom of the scale comes

yoroshiku tanomu,

which might be used between male friends. Its more polite variant

yoroshiku tanomimasu

might be used towards less familiar people or to superiors.

Going up in politeness, the phrase

yoroshiku onegai shimasu

means the same thing, but is used in business settings. It is possible to go further, replacing the polite "shimasu" with the humble itashimasu, to get

yoroshiku onegai itashimasu.

In extremely formal Japanese, such as that used on New Year's greeting cards, this may be replaced with an even more polite expression

yoroshiku onegai mōshiagemasu.

When making requests, at the bottom of the politeness scale comes the plain imperative tabero or kue, literally "Eat!", a simple order to be said to an inferior or someone considered to have no choice, such as a prisoner. This form might convey anger. Similarly, the "no/n da" suffix can make an order: taberu n da, or kuu n da "Eat!". To express anger, the suffix yagaru also exists: "kuiyagare", an extremely forceful and angry instruction to eat, expressing contempt for the addressee.

Negatives are formed by adding suffix na: taberu na "do not eat", gomi o suteru na: "do not throw away rubbish". Similarly, the negative of da, ja nai, can be used: taberu n ja nai.

More polite, but still strict, is the nasai suffix, which attaches to the i-form of the verb. This originates in the polite verb nasaru. Tabenasai thus is an order perhaps given by a parent to a child. This is often colloquially shortened to na, hence tabena. This form has no grammatical negative.

Requests can also be formed by adding to the "te" form of a verb. The plainest form adds kure, an irregular form of the verb kureru, to the te form. For example, tabete kure or kutte kure: "eat it", less forceful than "tabero". Negatives are made by using the negative "te" form: tabenaide kure or kuwanaide kure "don't eat it".

Going up one scale in politeness, the more polite verb kudasai is added. For example, tabete kudasai. With this polite form, the rough kū verb is unlikely to be used. Similarly, tabenaide kudasai: "please don't eat it".

A similar entry on the scale of politeness is made by using the imperative form of a polite verb. For example, meshiagaru, the polite verb for "to eat", when turned into meshiagare, the imperative, becomes the response to the set phrase itadakimasu.

Further, more polite forms are also possible. These involve the "i-form" of the verb rather than the "te form", and an honorific prefix (see honorific prefixes: verbs, below). Beyond simply increased politeness, this form is more formal, and is used when addressing a group, or as a general instruction, rather than directed at a particular person. For example, tsukau, "use", becomes o tsukai kudasai: "please use this". Politeness can be carried even further by conjugating kudasaru into its masu form and using the imperative, which becomes "o tsukai kudasaimase." The most polite form of this would probably be along the lines of "o tsukai ni natte itadakimasen deshou ka." "You will probably not bestow the favor of honorably using this?" Language like this, however, is rarely used.

Other ways to increase politeness involve indirection of the request: kore o tsukau you ni o negai shimasu: "I humbly request that you think about using this".

Honorific prefixes

The bikago (beautifying) prefixes o- (お〜) and go- (ご〜) (both written with the character 御- in kanji) are honorific prefixes which are applied to nouns and in some contexts to verbs. In general, go- (the on'yomi) precedes Sino-Japanese words (that is, words borrowed from Chinese or made from Sino-Japanese elements), while o- (the kun'yomi) precedes native Japanese words. There are many exceptions, however, where the o- prefix is used for Sino-Japanese words, including お茶 o-cha "tea", お大事に o-daiji-ni "get well", お電話 o-denwa "telephone", お稽古 o-keiko "practice", お宅 o-taku "home/you", and many others. There is also one common exception for the go- prefix, ごゆっくり go-yukkuri "slowly", where the main word is clearly not of Chinese origin.

These prefixes are used for two purposes: to speak respectfully about a stranger or social superior's family, belongings, or actions (as part of 尊敬語, sonkeigo); or to speak in a generally refined or polite way (敬語 keigo generally, specifically 美化語, bikago).

Prefix usage 

Although these honorific prefixes are often translated into English as "honorable" ("o-denwa," for example, would be given as "the honorable telephone") this translation is unwieldy and cannot convey the true feeling of their use in Japanese. These prefixes are essentially untranslatable, but their use indicates a polite respect for the item named or the person to or about whom one is speaking. A shorter translation is "dear"—for example, o-ko-san, お子さん, translates idiomatically as "your dear child"—and a similar sentiment is expressed in such English expressions as "Would you  care for a spot of tea?" or "Would you care for a little tea?" (as opposed to the plain "Would you like some tea?").

As with honorific word forms and titles, honorific prefixes are used when referring to or speaking with a social superior, or speaking about a superior's actions or possessions, but not usually when referring to oneself or one's own actions or possessions, or those of one's in-group.

For example, when referring to one's own order at a restaurant, one would use chūmon, but when referring to a customer's order, the restaurant staff would use go-chūmon.  Similarly, kazoku means "my family," while go-kazoku means "your family" (or, broadly speaking, someone else's family).

There are some words which frequently or always take these prefixes, regardless of who is speaking and to whom; these are often ordinary items which may have particular cultural significance, such as tea (o-cha) and rice (go-han). The word meshi, the Japanese equivalent of Sino-Japanese go-han, is considered rough and masculine (男性語).

In rare cases, both a base form and honorific are in use with different readings. A notable example is 利益 ri-eki "benefit, profit (e.g., business)" and 御利益 go-ri-yaku "divine favor, grace"; plain ri-yaku is sometimes used, but go-ri-eki is generally not. The former, an everyday term, uses the usual kan-on reading, while the later, a specialized religious term, uses the older go-on reading.

Honorific prefixes can be used for other items, possibly for a comic or sarcastic effect (for example, o-kokakōra, "honorable Coca-Cola"). Overuse of honorific prefixes may be taken as pretentious or simpering, and, as with other polite speech, they are more used by women than men.

In tea ceremony, common ingredients and equipment always take the honorific o- or go-, including water (o-mizu), hot water (o-yu), and tea bowls (o-chawan). However, these terms are often heard in daily life as well.

Foreign loanwords (gairaigo, except those that come from Chinese; see above) seldom take honorifics, but when they do o- seems to be preferable to go-. Examples are o-bīru (bīru: beer), which can sometimes be heard at restaurants, o-kādo (kādo: card, as in credit card or point card), which is often heard at supermarkets and department stores, and o-sōsu (sōsu: sauce).

Verbs 

For Chinese verbs (kango + suru), the prefix is generally pronounced go-, while for native Japanese verbs the prefix is pronounced o-. This is generally written in kana.

Female names 
O- was also commonly used as an honorific prefix to female given names in pre-war Japan, particularly in combination with dropping common suffixes such as -ko (-こ) (-子, literally "child"). This was a less polite honorific than "san". For example, a female servant named Kikuko would be referred to as O-kiku rather than Kikuko-san. This usage has disappeared in current Japanese, and has been replaced by using the diminutive suffix -chan instead (compare to male -kun), as in Aki-chan for Akiko.

Rare forms 
There is also a rarer prefix mi- (kun'yomi), which is mostly used in words related to gods and the emperor, such as mi-koshi (御輿, "portable shrine" in Shinto) and mi-na (御名, "the Holy Name" in Christianity). However, in this context it is often replaced by 神 ("god", also pronounced mi-), and then a further 御 (pronounced お-, o-) may be added, as in 御神輿 (o-mi-koshi). Sometimes the reading is ambiguous—for example, 御霊屋 "mausoleum" may be pronounced either mi-tama-ya or o-tama-ya. When pronounced as mi-, the prefix is usually written in kanji (unlike o- and go-, which are very frequently hiragana), but in some case it is written in hiragana, with a notable example being mi-hotoke (御仏, "Lord Buddha") often being written as み仏, partly to avoid confusion with the incorrect reading *go-butsu.

The honorific prefix generally does not fall in the middle. In compounds, where the honorific would fall in the middle, the honorific is almost always dropped. For example, お茶／御茶 o-cha "tea", but 麦茶 mugi-cha "barley tea", not ×麦お茶／麦御茶 *mugi-o-cha. There are exceptions, however, such as 乾御門 inui-go-mon "northwest gate (to imperial palace)"; note that 乾門 inui-mon "northwest gate (generally)" is also used.

Rarely, 御 is used instead as an honorific suffix, notably in 甥御 oigo "your nephew" and 姪御 meigo "your niece".

Another prefix, pronounced o- （お〜） and potentially confused with 御〜 when written in hiragana, is 阿〜 o-, which also has affectionate connotations, but is a separate term and not productive. It was previously used for endearment for women's names, and today is most notable in 阿多福／阿亀 (o-ta-fuku, o-kame, "moon-faced woman, homely woman"), which are frequently written as お多福／お亀, which may be mistaken (partially) for hiragana forms of ×御多福／×御亀. The character 阿 is more frequently pronounced a, and used especially in words and names from Sanskrit, such as the a in the syllable "aum", hence unfamiliar in this use, creating the potential for confusion.

English analogs 
While English has different registers, its levels of formality and politeness are not as formalized or as clearly defined as in Japanese. However, they can be instructive in gaining a feel for Japanese speech. English imperatives range from very blunt ("Give me the book"), to very indirect and elaborate ("If it's not too much trouble, could you please be so kind as to pass me the book?"—note the use of potential form, as in Japanese).

Similarly, changes in word use can make language more flowery or respectful—rather than "Do you know?", one might say "Are you familiar with?" or "Are you acquainted with?", which convey some of the feel of 知る shiru versus ご存知だ go-zonji da. In English, words of Germanic origin are generally plainer, those from French are generally more flowery (compare "drink" versus "beverage"), and those from Latin are more formal and technical (see Anglish and related articles); similarly in Japanese, words of Japanese origin are plainer, while words of Chinese origin are more formal. These are not hard-and-fast rules, but they give a feel for the gradations.

Humble language is less common in modern English, but is found in some contexts, such as guests saying "I am honored to be here," (rather than "I am glad to be here" or "I am happy to be here") and in various valedictions such as "Sincerely", which were formerly more formal and humble, with such forms as "I am, Sir, your most humble and obedient servant," and the like.

Some scholars argue that while honorific usage is necessarily affected by culturally specific values systems, the linguistic principles regulating its usage are not necessarily distinct from those of other languages, including honorific-poor languages such as English.

Manual keigo 

Some convenience stores and fast-food restaurants teach their young and part-time employees to verbally interact with customers in strictly prescribed ways laid down in instruction manuals. These forms of speech are known as マニュアル敬語 (manyuaru keigo, "manual keigo") or バイト敬語 (baito keigo, "part-timer keigo"). Manual keigo includes forms which would be considered incorrect or at least non-standard in terms of traditional usage (keigo and otherwise). A common example is udon ni narimasu (literally "[this] becomes udon", "[this] will be udon") as a polite form of udon desu ("[this] is udon"), instead of the standard udon de gozaimasu ("[this] is udon (polite)")—this manual keigo form is often criticized on the basis that the udon is not "becoming" anything, and therefore ni naru is incorrect, both as keigo and more generally.

See also

Aizuchi (相槌 aizuchi)
Japanese grammar
Japanese language
Japanese names
Japanese pronouns
Korean honorifics
Honorifics (linguistics)
Thai honorifics
Japanese etiquette

Notes

References

External links
jeKai article on keigo
Keigo Examples
SIL Glossary of linguistic terms - What is an honorific?
Keigo Practice Quizzes
29 Useful Keigo Phrases for the Japanese Workplace

Japanese grammar